Tom McArthur (30 June 1937 – 15 June 2018) was an Australian rules football field umpire in the Queensland Australian Football League.  He umpired 502 senior games, a national record, from 1959 to 1985.

Honours
In 2003, McArthur was named Queensland Umpire of the Century when the Queensland Team of the Century was announced.

McArthur was inducted into the Australian Football Hall of Fame in 2008.

He was inducted as one of seven inaugural Legends in the Queensland Australian Football Hall of Fame in 2008.

References

External links

 AFL Profile

Australian rules football umpires
Australian Football Hall of Fame inductees
1937 births
2018 deaths
Sportsmen from Queensland